The Istimrari estates were small feudal states (originally jagirs) in the 17th and 18th century Rajputana, the pre-1949 name of the present-day Indian state of Rājasthān, the largest state of the Republic of India.  The Istimrari chieftains paid tribute to their masters but were not compelled to participate in wars unless called upon by their respective chiefs.

In the Indian feudal system of 17th and 18th century, there were 66 Istimararis in the Rajputana (North west India). The Istimrari estates were originally only Jagirs, held under obligation of military service. The Marathas, however, who found it impolitic to encourage the warlike tendencies of their Rajput vassals, commuted this obligation for a fixed tribute.

Istimrari 
The Istimrari chieftains, accordingly, acquired the habit of regarding themselves as holders at a fixed and permanent quit-rent; and although during the earlier period of British rule extra cesses were levied from time to time, in 1841 the government remitted all such collections for the future. In 1873  were granted to the various , declaring their existing assessments to be fixed in perpetuity. There is, however, a special due on successions, its amount being separately stipulated in each .

List 
There are altogether 66 istimrari estates in Ajmer District. The istimdars are divided into tazimi and non-tazimi, the former being the native aristocracy of the Province and the latter persons of less consideration.

The tazimi istimdars 
 Kalera-Bogla
 Bhinai
 Sawar
 Masuda
 Pisangan
 Junia
 Deolia
 Kharwa
 Bandanwara
 Mehrun
 Para
 Deogaon - Baghera
 Gobindgarh
 Tantuti
 Barli
 Bagsuri
 Sadara

Bhum 
This term is peculiar to Rajputs. The word itself means 'land' and bhumid signifies the allodial proprietor. The tenure consists essentially in a hereditary, non-resumable, and inalienable property in the soil. The title of bhumid is so cherished that the greatest chiefs are solicitous to obtain it, even in villages entirely dependent on their authority as well as in those outside their territorial jurisdiction.

The Maharaja of Kishangarh, the Thakur of Fatehgarh in Kishangarh, the Thakur of Junia, the Thakur of Bandanwara, and the Thakur of Tantuti are among the bhumids of Ajmer. 

The duties of bhumids were originally threefold 
 To protect the village in which the bhum is, and the village cattle, from robbers;
 To protect the property of travelers within the village from theft and robbery; and
 To compensate sufferers from a crime which should have been prevented.

References 

Indian castes